Pauline Park (born 1960) is a transgender activist based in New York City.

Early life and education
Born in Korea, Park was adopted by European American parents and raised in the United States. As a child, she attended public schools in Milwaukee. Park received a B.A. in philosophy from the University of Wisconsin–Madison, an M.Sc. in European studies from the London School of Economics and Political Science, and a Ph.D. in political science at the University of Illinois at Urbana-Champaign. Park was the first student from any University of Illinois campus to receive a Fulbright fellowship for France, which she was awarded to fund her dissertation research on the Maastricht Treaty on European Union; she was introduced to Sen. William Fulbright at the American embassy in Paris at a reception for academic year 1991-92 Fulbright recipients for France.

Activism
In 1997, Park co-founded Queens Pride House, a center for the LGBT communities of Queens, and Iban/Queer Koreans of New York. Park was the founding first secretary of the board of directors of Queens Pride House and helped draft the organization's bylawys; she also supervised the board election in January 1999. Park served as coordinator of Iban/QKNY from 1997 to 1999, editing the organization's newsletter. In 1998, Park co-founded the New York Association for Gender Rights Advocacy (NYAGRA), the first statewide transgender advocacy organization in New York; she sought and secured over $175,000 in funding for NYAGRA from foundations.

Park served as coordinator of the work group which led the campaign for the transgender rights law enacted by the New York City Council (Int. No. 24, enacted as Local Law 3 of 2002).  She served on the working group that helped to draft guidelines—adopted by the Commission on Human Rights in December 2004—for implementation of the new statute.

Park negotiated inclusion of gender identity and expression in the Dignity For All Students Act (DASA), a safe schools bill enacted by the New York State Legislature in 2010, and the first fully transgender-inclusive legislation introduced in that body.  She also served on the steering committee of the coalition that secured enactment of the Dignity in All Schools Act by the New York City Council in  September 2004. In 2005, Park became the first openly transgender person chosen to be grand marshal of the New York City Pride March, the oldest and largest pride event in the United States.

In January 2012, Park participated in the first US LGBTQ delegation tour of Palestine.

In 2009, Park was named 'a leading advocate for transgender rights in New York' on Idealist in NYC's 'New York 40.' In December 2011, she was designated one of the 'official top 25 significant queer women of 2011' by Velvetpark. In October 2012, Park was one of 54 individuals named to a list of 'The Most Influential LGBT Asian Icons' by the Huffington post. In November 2012, she was named to a list of '50 Transgender Icons' for Transgender Day of Remembrance 2012.

Other
She is the subject of Envisioning Justice: The Journey of a Transgendered Woman, a 32-minute documentary about her life and work by documentarian Larry Tung that premiered at the New York LGBT Film Festival (NewFest) in 2008.

In 2010, Park recorded "Barricades Mystérieuses", which includes keyboard music by Couperin, Bach, Beethoven, Schumann, Chopin, and Debussy.

In June 2015, Park joined a group of Korean adoptees returning to Korea in search of information about their birth parents and relatives. Park's trip, which also coincided with the Queer Korea Festival that preceded the Seoul Pride Parade of that year, was the subject of a biographical documentary short film, "Coming Full Circle: The Journey of a Transgendered Korean Adoptee," also directed by Tung.

On 28 June 2015, she was the keynote speaker at the Queer Korea Festival/Seoul Pride Parade, the largest event in the history of the LGBT community Korea up to that date, with a crowd estimated at more than 35,000.

Park gave a presentation on the first US LGBTQ delegation tour of Palestine (Jan. 2012) at a meeting of Palestine Peace & Solidarity in South Korea 팔레스타인평화연대 on 6 July 2015, after which members of the group wrote: "오늘 폴린 박 토크 굉장했습니다. 팔레스타인연대운동과 성소수자 운동의 접점을 찾은 이 기분...! 앞으로 만들어나갈 연대가 기대됩니다. 오늘 후기와 녹화 영상도 곧 공유하겠습니다. 온오프로 함께 해 주신 분들 정말 고맙습니다!"

References

Further reading
 Park, Pauline. "Homeward Bound : The Journey of a Transgendered Korean Adoptee." Homeland : Women's Journeys Across Race, Place, and Time. Ed. Patricia J. Tumang and Jenesha De Rivera. Emeryville, CA: Seal Press, 2006. 125–34. 
 Park, Pauline. "An Interview with Pauline Park." Embodying Asian/American Sexualities. Ed. Gina Masequesmay and Sean Metzger. Plymouth, UK: Lexington Books, 2009. 105–113. 
 Park, Pauline. "Transgendering the Academy : Ensuring Transgender Inclusion in Higher Education." Trans Studies : The Challenge to Hetero/Homo Normatives. Ed. Yolanda Martínez-San Miguel and Sarah Tobias. New Brunswick, NJ: Rutgers University Press, 2016. 78–80.

External links
 
 Queens Pride House
 NYAGRA
 "Crossing the Line:  Korean American transgender people step beyond cultural stigmas to share their stories" - KoreAm Journal
Pauline Park Papers at Tamiment Library and Robert F. Wagner Labor Archives at New York University Special Collections

1960 births
Living people
Transgender women
Transgender rights activists
American LGBT rights activists
University of Wisconsin–Madison College of Letters and Science alumni
South Korean emigrants to the United States
American adoptees
American LGBT people of Asian descent
American transgender people
South Korean transgender people